Bogoroditsky District  is an administrative district (raion), one of the twenty-three in Tula Oblast, Russia. As a municipal division, it is incorporated as Bogoroditsky Municipal District. It is located in the east of the oblast. Its administrative center is the town of Bogoroditsk. Population: 51,643 (2010 Census);  The population of Bogoroditsk accounts for 61.8% of the district's total population.

References

Notes

Sources

Districts of Tula Oblast